Kwaebibirem Municipal District is one of the thirty-three districts in Eastern Region, Ghana. Originally created as an ordinary district assembly in 1988 when it was known as Kwaebibirem District, which was created from the former West Akim District Council. However on 6 February 2012 (effectively 28 June 2012), the southern part of the district was split off to create Denkyembour District; thus the remaining part has been retained as Kwaebibirem District. Later, it was elevated to municipal district assembly status on 15 March 2018 to become 'Kwaebibirem Municipal District. The municipality is located in the southern part of Eastern Region and has Kade as its capital town.

List of settlements

Sources
 
 District: Kwaebibirem Municipal District

References

-

Districts of the Eastern Region (Ghana)